Deeper Oceans is an album by Joseph Habedank. It received a Grammy Award nomination for Best Roots Gospel Album.

References 

2018 albums
Gospel albums by American artists